Bernard Alane (born Bernard Noël Vetel 25 December 1948) is a French actor and singer, he is the son of actress Annick Alane. He is best known in France for his roles in two films directed by Edouard Molinaro, Hibernatus and Mon oncle Benjamin, but has achieved better fame as voice actor, practically in dubbing. He is the regular French voice of Stanley Tucci.

Theater

Filmography

Dubbing

External links
 
 Bernard Alane at lesgensducinema

1948 births
Living people
French male film actors
French male musical theatre actors
French male television actors
French male voice actors
French pop singers
Singers from Paris